Julio César Sagasta (born 13 July 1914, date of death unknown) was an Argentine equestrian. He competed at the 1948 Summer Olympics and the 1952 Summer Olympics.

References

External links
 

1914 births
Year of death missing
Argentine male equestrians
Olympic equestrians of Argentina
Equestrians at the 1948 Summer Olympics
Equestrians at the 1952 Summer Olympics
Equestrians at the 1951 Pan American Games
Pan American Games medalists in equestrian
Pan American Games gold medalists for Argentina
Medalists at the 1951 Pan American Games
Place of birth missing